Yi Li may refer to:

Yi Li (basketball) (born 1987), Chinese basketball player
Yili (text), Chinese classic text

See also
Li Yi (disambiguation)
Yili (disambiguation)